Jean-Baptiste Bouquerot des Essarts (28 May 1771, in Asnan – 17 March 1833, in Fontainebleau) was a French maréchal de camp and Baron de l'Empire. He was the younger brother of the politician Thomas Bouquerot de Voligny.

French commanders of the Napoleonic Wars
French military personnel of the French Revolutionary Wars
1771 births
1833 deaths